Muskegon Catholic Central High School is a private, Roman Catholic high school in Muskegon, Michigan.  It is located in the Roman Catholic Diocese of Grand Rapids. Muskegon Catholic Central has won 13 football state championships (1979, 1980, 1982, 1990, 1991, 1995, 2000, 2006, 2008, 2013, 2014, 2015, 2016).

Notable alumni
Debbie Farhat - former member of the Michigan House of Representatives
Tony Ferguson - MMA fighter
Ruvell Martin - NFL wide receiver

References

Roman Catholic Diocese of Grand Rapids
Catholic secondary schools in Michigan
Buildings and structures in Muskegon, Michigan
Educational institutions established in 1953
Schools in Muskegon County, Michigan
1953 establishments in Michigan